Ahmadabad (also Romanized as Aḩmadābād; also known as Poshteh-ye Aḩmadābād) is a village in Hoseynabad-e Goruh Rural District, Rayen District, Kerman County, Kerman Province, Iran. At the 2006 census, its population was 187, in 49 families.

References 

Populated places in Kerman County